Arjunawiwāha was the first kakawin appeared in the East Javan period of the Javanese classical Hindu-Buddhist era in the 11th-century. Arjunawiwaha was composed by Mpu Kanwa during the reign of King Airlangga, king of the Kahuripan Kingdom, circa 1019 to 1042 CE. Arjunawiwaha is estimated to be finished in 1030.

The Kakawin tells the story of Arjuna when he was engaged in meditation and performing a severe practice of asceticism on Mount Meru. During his meditation he was tested by the Gods by sending two of the most beautiful apsaras — Supraba and Tilottama — to seduce him. Arjuna was not budging and firmly continued his meditation despite the apsara's seduction. Then the god Indra descended to earth disguising as an old Brahmin. They discussed about religious matters and Arjuna succeeded to answer Indra's questions, then he revealed his true identity and returned to svargaloka. Suddenly, a wild boar came raging, then Arjuna shot it with an arrow. But at the same time, an old hunter appeared that claimed that he also shot the boar, Arjuna and the old hunter were quarrelling about who killed the boar. As it turns out that the hunter is actually the god Shiva. Arjuna is given the task to kill Niwatakawaca, an asura that disturbed the peace and order of svargaloka. To do this task, the gods give Arjuna powerful weapons. Arjuna was eventually successful in his task to kill Niwatakawaca, and as the reward the Gods awarded Arjuna seven apsaras to marry and he allowed to enjoy the pleasure of svargaloka for a while.

The bas-reliefs of Arjunawiwaha were carved on East Javanese candis (temples), such as Candi Kedaton in Probolinggo Regency, Candi Surawana near Kediri, and Candi Jago near Malang.

See also
 Kakawin Bhāratayuddha
 Kakawin Hariwangsa
 Kakawin Ramayana
 Kakawin Sutasoma
 Nagarakretagama
 Pararaton
 Śiwarātrikalpa
 Smaradahana

References

Kakawin
Hinduism in Indonesia
Hindu texts